Burke Jackson (born December 14, 1949) is an American politician and rancher from Gillette, Wyoming who served in the Wyoming House of Representatives, representing the 52nd legislative district of Wyoming from 2004 to 2006 as a Republican.

Early life and education
Jackson was born in Gillette, Wyoming on December 14, 1949. He attended Campbell County High School and Casper College, graduating from the former with a degree.

Career
Jackson served in the Wyoming House of Representatives from 2004 until 2006, representing the 52nd legislative district of Wyoming as a Republican. During his time in office, Jackson served on the Select Committee on Legislative Facilities and the Education Commission of the States, in addition to the following committees.
Agriculture, State and Public Lands and Water Resources
House Labor, Health and Social Services
Jackson was succeeded by Republican Sue Wallis, also from Gillette.

Outside of politics, Jackson is a rancher.

Political positions
Jackson received a 100% rating from the Wyoming Prosperity Project in 2016.

Personal life
Jackson is a Protestant. He has a wife and two children.

Notes

References

External links
Official page at the Wyoming Legislature
Profile from Vote Smart

1949 births
Living people
21st-century American politicians
Republican Party members of the Wyoming House of Representatives
Ranchers from Wyoming
Casper College alumni
People from Gillette, Wyoming